Chatra (Satra) is a rural locality (a village) in Tanovsky Selsoviet, Blagovarsky District, Bashkortostan, Russia. The population was 93 as of 2010. There is 1 street.

Geography 
Chatra is located 24 km north of Yazykovo (the district's administrative centre) by road. Kyzyl-Chishma is the nearest rural locality.

References 

Rural localities in Blagovarsky District